Konini is a suburb in the West Auckland, New Zealand, under the local governance of Auckland Council. Kōnini is the Māori language name for the fruit of the tree fuchsia.

Geography

Konini is enclosed in lush bush at the western ends and tranquil suburban streets to the east. Konini Road is a long bending street that moves from the suburb of Glen Eden to the Waitākere Ranges and native rain forest. Konini forms a part of the Waitematā-Waitākere foothills ecological zone. Sheltered from the Tasman Sea by the Waitākere Ranges, the area was traditionally dominated by forests of kauri, Phyllocladus trichomanoides (tānekaha or celery pine) and rimu, with abundant nīkau palm and silver fern. The soils are a mix of Miocene Waitākere volcanic soil and Waitemata Group sedimentary rock.

History

The area is within the traditional rohe of Te Kawerau ā Maki, an iwi that traces their ancestry to some of the earliest inhabitants of the Auckland Region. West Auckland was known as Hikurangi, and the upper catchments of Te Wai-o-Pareira / Henderson Creek were known as Ōkaurirahi, a reference to the mature kauri forests of the area.

During the early colonial days of Auckland, much of Konini and Kaurilands was owned by Liverpool immigrant Hibernia Smythe, who aggregated 550 acres of land between 1854 and 1857 north of Titirangi. Smythe used the land for wood and logging, as well as farming sheep and cattle. Smythe had a reputation for being miserly, and after passing left his property to his nephew. Konini Road was built during the 1920s, when the neighbouring Kaurilands estate was being developed as a subdividison. Southern Konini began to be subdivided along with Kaurilands between the 1920s and 1940s. Konini School opened in May 1976 on the site of a former orchard and dairy farm, when suburban housing was being constructed in the area.

Demographics

Konini had a population of 3,555 at the 2018 New Zealand census, an increase of 63 people (1.8%) since the 2013 census, and an increase of 162 people (4.8%) since the 2006 census. There were 1,203 households, comprising 1,758 males and 1,800 females, giving a sex ratio of 0.98 males per female. The median age was 37.9 years (compared with 37.4 years nationally), with 789 people (22.2%) aged under 15 years, 609 (17.1%) aged 15 to 29, 1,770 (49.8%) aged 30 to 64, and 390 (11.0%) aged 65 or older.

Ethnicities were 83.5% European/Pākehā, 10.4% Māori, 7.6% Pacific peoples, 10.4% Asian, and 3.3% other ethnicities. People may identify with more than one ethnicity.

The percentage of people born overseas was 28.8, compared with 27.1% nationally.

Although some people chose not to answer the census's question about religious affiliation, 58.4% had no religion, 30.0% were Christian, 0.4% had Māori religious beliefs, 1.1% were Hindu, 0.8% were Muslim, 1.1% were Buddhist and 2.3% had other religions.

Of those at least 15 years old, 891 (32.2%) people had a bachelor's or higher degree, and 297 (10.7%) people had no formal qualifications. The median income was $42,100, compared with $31,800 nationally. 750 people (27.1%) earned over $70,000 compared to 17.2% nationally. The employment status of those at least 15 was that 1,584 (57.3%) people were employed full-time, 435 (15.7%) were part-time, and 72 (2.6%) were unemployed.

Education

The local State secondary schools are Kelston Boys' High School and Kelston Girls' College.

References

Suburbs of Auckland
Waitākere Ranges Local Board Area
Waitākere Ranges
West Auckland, New Zealand